Last and First or word chain is a game.

Last and First may also refer to:
The Last and the First, a novel by Ivy Compton-Burnett

See also
Last and First Men, a novel by Olaf Stapledon
First and Last (disambiguation)